Acamas or Akamas (Ancient Greek: Ἀκάμας, folk etymology: 'unwearying') was a name attributed to several characters in Greek mythology. The following three all fought in the Trojan War, and only the first was not mentioned by Homer. 
Acamas or Acamans, a Cyclops that lived in the company of Pyracmon or Pyragmon in Pelorum (north-east coast of Sicily).
Acamas, son of Theseus, mentioned by Virgil as being in the Trojan horse.
Acamas, one of the Thebans who laid an ambush for Tydeus when he returned from Thebes. He was killed by Tydeus.
Acamas, an Aetolian in the army of the Seven against Thebes.
Acamas, a soldier in the army of the Seven against Thebes. When the two armies attack each other at the gates of the city, the hard-hearted Acamas pierces the Theban horseman Iphis.
Acamas, son of Antenor, fought on the side of the Trojans and killed one Greek.
Acamas, son of Eussorus, from Thrace, and thus, could be the brother of Aenete and Cyzicus. With his comrade Peiros, son of Imbrasus, Acamas led a contingent of Thracian warriors to the Trojan War. Acamas was killed by Ajax or by Idomeneus who thrust him out of his chariot and caught him, as he fell, on the tip of his spear.
Acamas, one of the Suitors of Penelope who came from Dulichium along with other 56 wooers. He, with the other suitors, was slain by Odysseus with the aid of Eumaeus, Philoetius, and Telemachus.
Acamas, one of Actaeon's dogs.

Notes

References 

Apollodorus, The Library with an English Translation by Sir James George Frazer, F.B.A., F.R.S. in 2 Volumes, Cambridge, MA, Harvard University Press; London, William Heinemann Ltd. 1921. ISBN 0-674-99135-4. Online version at the Perseus Digital Library. Greek text available from the same website.
Apollonius Rhodius, Argonautica translated by Robert Cooper Seaton (1853-1915), R. C. Loeb Classical Library Volume 001. London, William Heinemann Ltd, 1912. Online version at the Topos Text Project.
Apollonius Rhodius, Argonautica. George W. Mooney. London. Longmans, Green. 1912. Greek text available at the Perseus Digital Library.
Dares Phrygius, from The Trojan War. The Chronicles of Dictys of Crete and Dares the Phrygian translated by Richard McIlwaine Frazer, Jr. (1931-). Indiana University Press. 1966. Online version at theio.com
Dictys Cretensis, from The Trojan War. The Chronicles of Dictys of Crete and Dares the Phrygian translated by Richard McIlwaine Frazer, Jr. (1931-). Indiana University Press. 1966. Online version at the Topos Text Project.
Gaius Julius Hyginus, Fabulae from The Myths of Hyginus translated and edited by Mary Grant. University of Kansas Publications in Humanistic Studies. Online version at the Topos Text Project.
Gaius Valerius Flaccus, Argonautica translated by Mozley, J H. Loeb Classical Library Volume 286. Cambridge, MA, Harvard University Press; London, William Heinemann Ltd. 1928. Online version at theio.com.
Gaius Valerius Flaccus, Argonauticon. Otto Kramer. Leipzig. Teubner. 1913. Latin text available at the Perseus Digital Library.
Graves, Robert, The Greek Myths, Harmondsworth, London, England, Penguin Books, 1960. 
Graves, Robert, The Greek Myths: The Complete and Definitive Edition. Penguin Books Limited. 2017. 
Homer, The Iliad with an English Translation by A.T. Murray, Ph.D. in two volumes. Cambridge, MA., Harvard University Press; London, William Heinemann, Ltd. 1924. . Online version at the Perseus Digital Library.
Homer, Homeri Opera in five volumes. Oxford, Oxford University Press. 1920. . Greek text available at the Perseus Digital Library.
The Orphic Argonautica, translated by Jason Colavito.  Copyright 2011. Online version at the Topos Text Project.
Publius Papinius Statius, The Thebaid translated by John Henry Mozley. Loeb Classical Library Volumes. Cambridge, MA, Harvard University Press; London, William Heinemann Ltd. 1928. Online version at the Topos Text Project.
Publius Papinius Statius, The Thebaid. Vol I-II. John Henry Mozley. London: William Heinemann; New York: G.P. Putnam's Sons. 1928. Latin text available at the Perseus Digital Library.
Publius Vergilius Maro, Aeneid. Theodore C. Williams. trans. Boston. Houghton Mifflin Co. 1910. Online version at the Perseus Digital Library.
Publius Vergilius Maro, Bucolics, Aeneid, and Georgics. J. B. Greenough. Boston. Ginn & Co. 1900. Latin text available at the Perseus Digital Library.

Cyclopes
Achaeans (Homer)
Trojans
Suitors of Penelope
Greek masculine given names
Given names of Greek language origin